Craughwell railway station is a railway station serving the village of Craughwell in County Galway, Ireland. It is an unmanned single-platform station.

History
A station existed in the town (originally on the Waterford, Limerick and Western Railway) from the mid-19th century, until the closure to passengers of the line from Ennis-Athenry in 1976.

As part of Iarnród Éireann's Western Rail Corridor project, under the Transport 21 plan, Iarnród Éireann reopened the station, having built a new single platform facility and car park close to the original site.

References

External links
Irish Rail Craughwell Station Webpage

Railway stations in County Galway
Railway stations opened in 1869
Railway stations closed in 1976
Railway stations opened in 2010
1869 establishments in Ireland
Railway stations in the Republic of Ireland opened in the 19th century